Frank Stephen "Ping" Bodie (October 8, 1887 – December 17, 1961), born Francesco Stephano Pezzolo, was a center fielder in Major League Baseball who played for the Chicago White Sox (1911–1914), Philadelphia Athletics (1917) and New York Yankees (1919–1921). Bodie batted and threw right-handed. He was born in San Francisco.

Bodie was nicknamed "Ping" for the sound made when his fifty-two-ounce bat crashed into the "dead" ball of his era. Another nickname given to him was "The Wonderful Wop." He took the surname Bodie from the California town he once lived in.

It said that Bodie provided much of the inspiration for Ring Lardner's creation of the famous baseball fictional series You Know Me Al. Appearing originally in the Saturday Evening Post, the piece was written in the form of letters written by a bush league baseball player to a friend back home.

Career
In 1910, playing for the San Francisco Seals of the Pacific Coast League, Bodie hit the then-fantastic total of 30 home runs, and quickly broke into the big leagues with the Chicago White Sox in 1911. Ping became a regular for four years with Chicago hitting .289 with 97 RBIs, .294, .265 and .229. After some clashes with manager Jimmy Callahan in 1914, he was sold back to the San Francisco Seals.

In 1917, Bodie returned to the major leagues with the Philadelphia Athletics. In that season he ranked among the American League top 10 in eight offensive categories: seven home runs (3rd) with 74 RBIs (6th), 233 total bases (5th), 46 extra-base hits (5th), 11 triples (8th), 28 doubles (9th), a .418 slugging percentage (6th), and a .774 OPS (10th). He also led AL outfielders with 32 assists.

In 1918, the New York Yankees purchased first baseman George Burns from the Detroit Tigers and immediately traded him to the Athletics for Bodie. With the Yankees he batted .256, .278 and .295 in three full seasons. It was during this time that Bodie became Babe Ruth's first Yankee roommate. When asked about rooming with Ruth, Bodie said "Room with him. Why, I room with the big monkey's baggage!"

Noted for a voracious appetite, Bodie competed against a Jacksonville Zoo ostrich named Percy in an eating contest on April 3, 1919 which had been arranged by Yankees co-owner Cap Huston as a publicity stunt. Percy had previously been touted as the "world's greatest eater." The contest was structured similar to a boxing match, with Bodie selecting his favorite dish of spaghetti as the food to be devoured. He was declared the winner after finishing his 11th plate before Percy passed out while starting his.

Bodie was traded to the Boston Red Sox in August 1921. New York went on to win the American League pennant that year. When Bodie asked for a half share of the 1921 World Series money, the Yankees turned him down. After the season was over, he refused to go back to the Red Sox and returned home.

Bodie spent the next seven seasons in the minors playing with the Vernon Tigers and San Francisco Missions in the Pacific Coast League, the Des Moines club in the Western League, and the Wichita Falls and San Antonio Missions in the Texas League.

In a nine-season major league career, Bodie was a .275 hitter with 43 home runs and 514 RBIs in 1,050 games.

After his retirement from baseball, Bodie was an electrician for 32 years on Hollywood movie lots and a bit actor, mostly with Universal Studios. He is given credit for inspiring other West Coast Italian American ballplayers who followed him – Tony Lazzeri, Frank Crosetti, and the brothers Joe, Dom and Vince DiMaggio, between others.

Bodie died of cancer in San Francisco, California, at the age of 74. He is a member of the Italian American Sports Hall of Fame.

See also
 Chicago White Sox all-time roster

Sources
Ping Bodie - Baseballbiography.com

The Baseball Biography Project
The Deadball Era
Vintage Card Traders

References

Further reading
 "'Ping' Bodie a Sandlot Product; Home Run Champion Native Son". The San Francisco Call. September 25, 1910.
 "Ping Bodie Not His Name". The Buffalo Times. June 14, 1911.
 "Italian Player on Chicago Team". The El Paso Herald. May 14, 1912.
 "Bodie's Humor Surely Saved Him". Harper's Weekly. September 25, 1915.
 "Ping Bodie Just Laughs at Knockers". The Pittsburgh Press. September 1, 1916.
 "These Boys Move Up to the Majors; Early History of Men About to Leave Coast: Ping Bodie". San Francisco Chronicle. September 19, 1916.
 "Ping Bodie Is Lionized by Phillie Baseball Fans". The White Earth Tomahawk. August 2, 1917.
 Ballard, Wood (March 19, 1918). "Ping Bodie and His Old War Club Reach Yankee Camp; Fence-Buster Springs Joke On Maconites; Town Fails to Identify Francesco Pizzola as Great Player". New York Tribune.
 MacBeth, W. J. (May 7, 1918). "Yankees Humble Red Sox; Ping Bodie Brings Glory to Yankee Escutcheon; Leads Huggins' Men to Attack That Smothers Red Sox, 10 to 3, the Third Straight Defeat Here for League Leaders". New York Tribune.
 Ballard, Wood (May 12, 1918). "Francisco Pezzolo, Snapped on the Ball Field, Known as Ping Bodie; Bodie Proves Big Asset to Huggins's Team". New York Tribune.
 McGeehan, W. O. (April 6, 1919). "Ping's Big Battle (or Overcoming the Ostrich)". New York Tribune.
 McGeehan, W. O. (June 15, 1919). "Yankees Trounce Browns; Thormahlen Scores Sixth Straight with Bodie's Aid; Ping Makes Timely Hits and Startling Catches in 7 to 2 Victory Over St. Louis". New York Tribune.
 McGeehan, W. O. (September 21, 1919). "Yankees Again Defeat Tigers in Easy Game; Four-Run Rally Nets Thormahlen Victory; Bodie's Wallop Starts Drive That Sends Ehnke to Defeat by 6 to 3; Signor Pizzola Also Makes Great Throw That Cuts Down Cobb at Plate". New York Tribune.
 McGeehan, W. O. (March 29, 1920). "In All Fairness: Rules Will Cause Disputes; The Revolt of Pizzola". New York Tribune.
 McGeehan, W. O. (June 27, 1920). "Yankees Overwhelm Red Sox, 14 to 0; Collins, Recruit Pitcher, Yields One Scratch Hit; Bodie Makes Desperate but Futile Effort to Give Youngster No-Hit, No-Run Game before 37,000 Customers". New York Tribune.
 McGeehan, W. O. (July 19, 1920). "Yankees Again Defeat White Sox; Ping Bodie, Wonderful Wop, Whole Show in Ball Game". New York Tribune.
 Taylor, Charles A. (June 6, 1921). "Yankees Nose Out Browns; Bodie's Triple in the Seventh Scores Winning Run for Locals". New York Tribune.
 Kemp, Abe (August 27, 1927). "The Smile That Cheats the Baseball Wolf: Bodie Day at Recreation Park; Veteran Slugger To Be Honored" San Francisco Chronicle. 
 Brenner, I. C. (February 27, 1933)."Shadows of the Past: Ping Bodie". The Washington Star.
 Kemp, Abe (July 16, 1935). "Di Maggio and Bodie---Two Italian Greats". San Francisco Examiner.
 Kemp, Abe (January 2, 1937). "Signor Ping Bodie—He Could Bust 'Em". The San Francisco Examiner.
 Kemp, Abe (February 17, 1941). "On the Nose". San Francisco Chronicle.
 "Remember Ping Bodie? He's Now in Hollywood". The Midland Journal. August 22, 1941.
 Hernon, Jack (April 24, 1951). "Roamin' Around: All the Dope in New Baseball Book". Pittsburgh Post-Gazette.

External links

 Ping Bodie at Baseball Biography Project

Francesco Stephano Pezzolo at The Favale Connection

1887 births
1961 deaths
American people of Italian descent
Chicago White Sox players
New York Yankees players
Philadelphia Athletics players
Major League Baseball center fielders
Baseball players from San Francisco
San Francisco (minor league baseball) players
Presidio (minor league baseball) players
San Francisco Orphans players
San Francisco Seals (baseball) players
Vernon Tigers players
Des Moines Boosters players
Wichita Falls Spudders players
San Antonio Bears players
Mission Reds players